Bengaluru Monorail was a rapid transit monorail system proposed for the city of Bengaluru, India.

In 2012 the government was advised light rail was a better option.

In 2016 the first line of Namma Metro for the city was opened.

History
The State government appointed Capita Symonds, a UK-based consultancy firm, to suggest the best feeder rail network for Bengaluru. Capita Symonds stated that Light Rail Transit (LRT) was more advantageous than monorail.

The Bangalore Airport Rail Link (BARL) Ltd is the nodal agency for implementing the project.

Network

See also
 Namma Metro
 Bengaluru Commuter Rail
 Bangalore

References

Transport in Bangalore
Proposed monorails in India